Little Wenlock is a village and civil parish in Shropshire, England. The population of the civil parish at the 2011 census was 605. It was mentioned in the Domesday Book, when it belonged to Wenlock Priory. Ancient habitation is attested by the discovery of two caches of Bronze Age weapons.

The village is situated two miles west of Dawley, a market town now part of Telford.

Nearby is the 1335-foot-high Wrekin, one of Shropshire's iconic hills with an ancient hill fort. Part of it falls within Little Wenlock parish, while the adjoining parts fall into other parishes.

The name "Wenlock" as found in Much Wenlock and Little Wenlock (and also Great Wenlock, a now obsolete name, but found in some historic sources) is probably derived from the Old English *Wenan loca meaning "Wena's Stronghold" (wéna being feminine and meaning "hope") The town was recorded in the Domesday Book as Wenloch. The "Little" of the name distinguishes it from the larger settlement and market town of Much Wenlock, which is situated several miles to the south, on the other side of the River Severn.

11-year-old Alice Glaston from Little Wenlock was hanged together with two men in Much Wenlock on 13 April 1546, for an unknown crime. She is the youngest known girl legally executed in Great Britain.

The village features a public house (the "Huntsman Inn"), village hall, playing field and the Church of England parish church of St Lawrence. David Cranage, later Dean of Norwich, was curate at the church in 1897-98.

For many years there was small scale mining in the parish, for coal, limestone and fire clay.

See also
Listed buildings in Little Wenlock

Notes

External links

Little Wenlock Parish Council

Villages in Shropshire
Telford and Wrekin
Civil parishes in Shropshire